Kacho López Mari is a Puerto Rican director and co-founder of Puerto Rican production company Filmes Zapatero. He is a 7-time nominee and two time Latin Grammy Award winner for his music videos “Ojos Color Sol” (Calle 13) (featuring actors Gael García Bernal and María Valverde) and “Loco de Amor” (Juanes). His second collaboration with Juanes titled Mis Planes son Amarte (coincidentally Latin music's first visual album), got López Mari his 6th Latin Grammy nomination and his 3rd for Best Music Video, Long Form.

Career 
Kacho López Mari started his career in the field of graphic design. After transitioning into film, with his work in the now-defunct production company Paradiso Films, López Mari founded Filmes Zapatero with his partner, award-winning producer Tristana Robles in 2011. He got his start directing music videos for Reggaeton/Underground artists like Tego Calderón and Daddy Yankee, directing the videos for the singles "Abayarde" and  "Gasolina"  respectively. Throughout his career, López Mari has directed music videos for Bad Bunny, Ricky Martin, Juanes, Ile, Aventura, Daddy Yankee, Calle 13, Don Omar, Tego Calderón and Chayanne among many others.

Filmography

Music Videos

Accolades

References 

Year of birth missing (living people)
Living people
People from Santurce, Puerto Rico
Puerto Rican film directors
American music video directors
American graphic designers